Ten Kate is a Dutch toponymic surname originally meaning "at the house". The modern Dutch word kot ("kennel") still reminds of the archaic words kate, kote, and kotte for "house". People with this surname include:

 Herman Frederik Carel ten Kate (artist) (1822–1891), Dutch painter and engraver
 Herman Frederik Carel ten Kate (anthropologist) (1858–1931), Dutch anthropologist, son of the above
 Jan Jakob Lodewijk ten Kate (1819–1889), Dutch prose writer and poet
 Lambert ten Kate (1674–1731), Dutch linguist
 Marti ten Kate (born 1958), Dutch retired long-distance runner
 Monica Ten-Kate, American psychic and star of the reality TV show Monica the Medium

See also
 Ten Cate, Dutch surname with the same origin
 Ten Kate Racing, a Dutch-based motorcycle racing team founded by Gerrit ten Kate

References

Dutch-language surnames
Toponymic surnames